Nehoda (Czech/Slovak feminine: Nehodová) or Negoda is a surname of Slavic-language origin. It may refer to:
Maksim Nehoda (born 1998), Belarusian wrestler
Michal Nehoda (born 1976), Czech football forward
Natalya Negoda (born 1963), Russian actress
Zdeněk Nehoda (born 1952), Czech football forward

See also
 
 

Czech-language surnames